Thaís Felipe Pacholek  (born December 20, 1983 in Curitiba, Brazil) is a Brazilian actress.

Filmography

Television

References

Living people
1983 births
Brazilian people of Polish descent
21st-century Brazilian actresses
Brazilian female models
Actresses from Curitiba
Brazilian telenovela actresses